3-Fluoromethamphetamine (3-FMA) is a stimulant drug related to methamphetamine and 3-fluoroamphetamine. It has been sold online as a designer drug.

Legal Status

Canada 
As of 1996, 3-FMA is a controlled substance in Canada, due to being an analog of methamphetamine.

China 
As of October 2015, 3-FMA is a controlled substance in China.

United States 
As a close analog of scheduled controlled substance, sale or possession of 3-FMA could be potentially be prosecuted under the Federal Analogue Act.

See also 
 2-Fluoroamphetamine
 2-Fluoromethamphetamine
 3-Fluoroamphetamine
 3-Fluoroethamphetamine
 3-Fluoromethcathinone
 4-Fluoroamphetamine
 4-Fluoromethamphetamine
 3-Chloromethamphetamine

References 

Designer drugs
Methamphetamines
Euphoriants
Fluoroarenes
Norepinephrine-dopamine releasing agents